Erica Lara Rose (born July 6, 1982) is an American competition swimmer who specialized in long-distance and open water event.  Rose is a former world champion.

At the 1997 Pan Pacific Swimming Championships, she finished third in the 1500-metre freestyle, but she didn't receive a medal due to meet rule that one country can only win two medals per event.

At the 1998 World Aquatics Championships in Perth, Australia, Rose won the gold medal in the 5-kilometer open water event, a feat she achieved at age 15.

References

External links
ericaroseswimming.com—official website.

1982 births
Living people
American female freestyle swimmers
American long-distance swimmers
Northwestern Wildcats women's swimmers
Sportspeople from Cleveland
World Aquatics Championships medalists in open water swimming